Eudonia abrupta is a moth in the family Crambidae. It was described by Wei-Chun Li in 2012. It is found in Jiangxi, China.

References

Moths described in 2012
Eudonia